Mickaël Pascal (born 11 October 1979) is a French former professional downhill mountain biker. He finished second at the UCI Downhill World Championships in 1999 and 2003 and third in 1998 and 2000. He also won the National Downhill Championships in 2008 and 2011. He also finished third overall and won two events at the 2001 UCI Downhill World Cup.

References

External links

Living people
1979 births

Downhill mountain bikers

French male cyclists
Sportspeople from Chambéry
French mountain bikers
Cyclists from Auvergne-Rhône-Alpes